Pierre Gautherat (born 16 January 2003) is a French cyclist, who currently rides for UCI WorldTeam .

Major results
2020
 3rd Time trial, National Junior Championships
2021
 2nd Road race, National Junior Championships
2022
 10th Primus Classic
2023
 7th Le Samyn
 9th Cholet-Pays de la Loire

References

External links

2003 births
Living people
French male cyclists
Sportspeople from Colmar
21st-century French people